Astaneh (also Romanized as Āstāneh) is a city in the Central District of Shazand County, Markazi Province, Iran.  At the 2006 census, its population was 6,969, in 1,941 families.

References

Populated places in Shazand County
Cities in Markazi Province